Nicholas Welch,  (born c. 1964) is a retrospectively dismissed British Army major general who served as the Assistant Chief of the General Staff. In March 2021 he became the highest ranked British officer to be convicted at a court martial in over 200 years.

Military career
Welch was commissioned into the Gloucestershire Regiment on 20 April 1984. His deployments included Berlin, Northern Ireland and Belize.

Welch became commanding officer of the 1st Battalion, the Royal Gloucestershire, Berkshire and Wiltshire Regiment in 2002 and, having been promoted to colonel on 30 June 2006, he became commander of 7 Armoured Brigade based in Bergen-Hohne, Germany in March 2009. He was deployed with 2nd Marine Expeditionary Brigade as the deputy commander of Regional Command (South West) in Afghanistan in September 2011, and briefly served as Deputy Director of Strategic Studies in the Ministry of Defence before becoming Director Army Division at the Joint Services Command and Staff College in August 2012. He went on to be Chief of Staff, Allied Rapid Reaction Corps in July 2014, and Assistant Chief of the General Staff in December 2015.

Welch was awarded the Queen's Commendation for Valuable Service for service in the former Yugoslavia in March 2005. He was appointed a Member of the Order of the British Empire in the 2001 New Year Honours and an Officer of the Order of the British Empire in the 2006 New Year Honours. After leaving the army, Welch became Chief Operating Officer of Arts University Bournemouth.

In 2020, Welch became the most senior officer to face a court martial since 1815 over accusations that he fraudulently claimed monetary expenses. He was found guilty of fraud in March 2021, sentenced to 21 months in a civilian prison and retrospectively dismissed from the army.

References

British Army generals
British Army personnel of the War in Afghanistan (2001–2021)
Gloucestershire Regiment officers
Living people
NATO personnel in the Bosnian War
Officers of the Order of the British Empire
Recipients of the Commendation for Valuable Service
People associated with Arts University Bournemouth
1964 births
British people convicted of fraud
Royal Gloucestershire, Berkshire and Wiltshire Regiment officers
British Army personnel who were court-martialled